Robert Merrick (24 November 1917 – 15 May 1991) was an Australian rules footballer who played with Fitzroy in the Victorian Football League (VFL).

He was of no relation to the better-known Fitzroy player of the same name, that played for the club between 1919 and 1926.

Early career
Merrick, who was born in Warragul, played his junior football with Don Rovers in the Eastern District Football League, followed by Pascoe Vale. While at Pascoe Vale he was recruited by Richmond scouts and put on their supplementary list for the 1938 VFL season. Residentially tied to Essendon, the club wanted him to play for them so were unwilling to grant him a clearance to go to Richmond. Instead he returned to Pascoe Vale, but later in 1938 made five appearances for the Carlton seconds. In 1939, back at Pascoe Vale, Merrick won the Sub-District League's best and fairest award, the Marcus Clota Trophy, with a record tally of votes.

Fitzroy recruit
Merrick starred at centre half-forward for the Sub-District league in the annual combined match against Maryborough in 1939, which caught the attention of Fitzroy club secretary Percy Mitchell. Successful in obtaining a clearance from Carlton, Merrick performed well in practice matches for Fitzroy and was brought into the senior team for the opening round of the 1940 VFL season.

On debut, against St Kilda at Brunswick Street Oval, Merrick played on a half forward flank in an 11-point win. He did not register a goal but hit the top of the post with one shot. The following weekend, in round two, he was in the team that lost to North Melbourne at Arden Street Oval by 55-points. He again started on a flank, but struggled against the pace of Ossy Parks. At the beginning of the second quarter he was moved to centre half-forward, switching places with Alf Clay. Described as having a safe mark, Merrick was said to be more suited to this position.

Military service
His career came to a stop after only two games when on 31 May 1940 he enlisted for armed service. During the war he was reported to have been wounded three times, twice in the Middle East and later in Lae. He had just recovered from malaria when he returned to Fitzroy in the 1944 VFL season.

Return to Fitzroy
Merrick was again used a forward in his second stint at Fitzroy, starting in a forward pocket for the first two rounds of the season, against St Kilda and Collingwood. He was 19th man in Fitzroy's round three win over North Melbourne and came on in the last quarter to replace and injured Clen Denning. In round four, against Richmond, Merrick played as a centre half-forward, later going to the back pocket to play on Jack Dyer.

Retirement
His war injuries, which left him with shrapnel in his lungs, however proved to be affecting him too much and he was forced to retire on the advice of doctors.

References

External links

1917 births
1991 deaths
Australian rules footballers from Victoria (Australia)
Fitzroy Football Club players
Pascoe Vale Football Club players
Australian military personnel of World War II
People from Warragul
Military personnel from Victoria (Australia)